Soga Monogatari is a Japanese military chronicle-tale based on the vengeance incident, Revenge of Soga Brothers. The story is often known as The (illustrated) Tale of the Soga Brothers or The Revenge of the Soga Brothers. It is sometimes written as Soga Monogatari Zue (The Tale of the Soga brothers in pictures). It is regarded by some as the last of the gunki monogatari or great "war tales".

The brothers are Soga Sukenari and Soga Tokimune, Sukenari being the older of the two. When the boys were younger they were known as Ichimanmaru and Hakoomaru. In Japanese the Soga brothers are described as Soga kyodai. Their names are also written as Soga no Gorō and Soga no Jūrō. The name Soga is the name of their stepfather, which became their surname after their mother remarried. The name of their biological father was Kawazu-Saburō.

Plot
Events take place in Japan in the 12th century. The general accepted version is that the father of the two boys was killed (the reasons differ, but it was probably an argument over land rights) when they were infants. As adults they became skilled fighters intent on avenging their father and retrieving his sword Tomokirimaru. 

In May 1193, the Soga brothers participated in shogun Minamoto Yoritomo's grand hunting event Fuji no Makigari. On the last night of the event, the brothers took their revenge and killed their father Kudō Yūsuke. After the brothers killed ten other participants in a fierce battle, the elder brother Sukenari was shot by Yūsuke's subordinate Nitta Tadatsune. The younger brother Tokimune killed all the samurai one by one who attempted to stop him, and broke into Yoritomo's living quarters. However, Yoritomo's close vassal Gosho no Gorōmaru, who was in Yoritomo's bedchamber, took Tokimune down, thus ending the massacre and saving the shogun from a possible assassination attempt. The next day, Tokimune was brought in for questioning by Yoritomo about the motives of the incident, but was ultimately executed.

Authorship
The Tale of the Soga Brothers origin cannot be traced to a single creator.  Like most of these historical stories, it is the result of the compounding of (often differing) versions passed down through an oral or other tradition. The origin of the story may be true, but the story is probably romanticised. In some versions of the story it is only revealed at the end that the main character is actually one of the brothers.

Theme
The Tale of the Soga Brothers is an example of "blood revenge", similar to a vendetta.

In popular culture
The story has been the subject of many Noh, kabuki and bunraku performances. There are also updated versions such as Sukeroku (The Flower of Edo) (an 18th century kabuki play, which is regarded as one of the Kabuki Jūhachiban). It is also said that the Soga tales in Kōwakamai are based on this tale.

The story and its performers have been popular subjects for woodblock prints, netsuke and okimono.

The story has also been the subject of a number of films.

Notes
In Japan there are many statues of the brothers (such as the famous statue in the Hachiman Jinja in Kawazu, Shizuoka). According to tradition they were buried at the foot of Mount Fuji, there is a sculpture of their tombs among the stone statues in Hakone.

Otodome Falls is one of the locations in a version of the tale from the Kamakura period.

There is no relation with the Soga clan.

Translations
The story was translated by Thomas J. Cogan. This translation was reviewed by Laurence Kominz in the Harvard Journal of Asiatic Studies.

Gallery

References

External links

 A website dedicated to Samurai culture
 A website dedicated to the stories of Old Japan
 An example of Soga Monogatari Zue by Andō Hiroshige on the British Museum online collection website
 The Tale of the Soga Brothers on the Asian Art Museum website
 The Tale of the Soga Brothers on the Honolulu Museum of Art website

Japanese literature
Japanese folklore
Monogatari
Japanese legends
Revenge
Gunki monogatari